Eugene Oliver Cockrell (June 10, 1934 – May 16, 2020) was an American football offensive tackle who played three seasons with the New York Titans of the American Football League (AFL). He was drafted by the Cleveland Browns of the National Football League (NFL) in the 28th round of the 1957 NFL Draft. He played college football at Oklahoma and Hardin–Simmons. He was also a member of the Saskatchewan Roughriders of the Western Interprovincial Football Union (WIFU). He was inducted into the Texas Panhandle Sports Hall of Fame in 2010.

Early years and college career
Cockrell attended Pampa High School in Pampa, Texas.

He first played college football for the Oklahoma Sooners of the University of Oklahoma. He left the University due to his job as a professional on the rodeo circuit. He re-enrolled in school to play for the Hardin–Simmons Cowboys of Hardin–Simmons University after concluding, with the help of Sammy Baugh, that he should return to college.

Professional career
Cockrell was selected by the Cleveland Browns of the NFL with the 330th pick in the 1957 NFL Draft. He played in twelve games for the WIFU's Saskatchewan Roughriders in 1957. He played for the New York Titans of the AFL from 1960 to 1962.

He died on May 16, 2020, in Decatur, Texas at age 85.

References

External links
Just Sports Stats

1934 births
2020 deaths
American football offensive tackles
Canadian football offensive linemen
American players of Canadian football
Oklahoma Sooners football players
Hardin–Simmons Cowboys football players
Saskatchewan Roughriders players
New York Titans (AFL) players
Players of American football from Texas
People from Pampa, Texas